The 36th Armored Division, also known as the Ga'ash Formation ("Rage"), is the largest regular-service armored division in the Armored Corps of the Israel Defense Forces (IDF). It was subordinate to the Northern Regional Command until February 2014.

The division was established in September 1954 and until 1958 was led by Aluf Avraham Yoffe. At the time, divisional commands were mission-based commands without organic forces, but rather with troops apportioned according to given missions. It was led by Aluf Zvi Zamir from 1958 until he was succeeded by Aluf Uzi Narkiss in 1962, who led until 1965. In the years 1965–1969, it was led by Aluf Elad Peled.

During the 1967 Six-Day War, the division led the battles in the northern West Bank, commanding the Barak Armored Brigade (then the 45th Armored Brigade), the 37th Brigade and forces from the 1st Brigade. Later, it oversaw the occupation of the southern Golan Heights. After the war, from 1969 to 1972, the division was led by Aluf Shmuel Gonen (Gorodish). From 1972 to 1974, it was led by then-Aluf Rafael Eitan.

During the Yom Kippur War of October 1973, the division fought in the defensive battles over the northern Golan, and afterwards broke deeper into Syrian territory. During Operation Litani, Israel's invasion of Lebanon in 1978, the division fought on the eastern front. During the 1982 Lebanon War, it fought on the central front, proceeding along the coastal route to Beirut.

The division was based on the Golan Heights until February 2014 and included the 7th Armoured Brigade and 188th 'Barak' Armoured Brigade. As of July 2013, it is led by Brigadier-General Itzik Turjeman who replaced Brigadier-General Tamir Haiman.

Units 

 1st "Golani" Infantry Brigade
6th Etzioni Brigade 
 7th "Saar me-Golan/Storm from Golan" Armor Brigade
 188th "Barak/Lightning" Armor Brigade
 263rd "Merkavot ha-Esh/Chariots of Fire"  (Reserve) Armor Brigade
 282nd "Golan" Artillery Regiment
 334th "Ra’am/Thunder" Artillery Battalion (MLRS)
 404th "Shafifon/Viper" (Reserve) Artillery Battalion (M109A5)
 405th "Namer/Leopard" Artillery Battalion (M109A5)
 411th  "Keren/Ray" Artillery Battalion (M109A5)
 611th "Eitam/Eagle" Target Acquisition Battalion
 389th "Sion" Signal Battalion

References 

Northern Command (Israel)
Divisions of Israel